Lee Te Maari (born 28 July 1985) is a former professional rugby league footballer who played in the 2000s and 2010s for St George, Canterbury-Bankstown and Parramatta. Te Maari primarily played in the second row.

Early life
Te Maari played his junior rugby league for the Joondalup Giants in the Perth Rugby League.

Playing career
Te Maari made his first grade debut for St. George in round 7 of the 2006 NRL season against the Sydney Roosters at the Sydney Football Stadium.  In 2007, Te Maari joined Canterbury-Bankstown.  He made 8 appearances for Canterbury in the 2007 NRL season including the club's qualifying final loss against North Queensland.

In the 2008 NRL season, Te Maari made a career best 22 appearances as Canterbury finished bottom of the table and claimed the wooden spoon.

Te Maari was named in the New Zealand training squad for the 2008 Rugby League World Cup.

On 16 March 2010, Te Maari was dismissed by the Canterbury-Bankstown Bulldogs after repeated breaches of the Club’s Code of Conduct including numerous driving offences.

On 6 April 2010, Te Maari joined the Wentworthville Magpies and was selected to play in the Bundaberg Red Cup Team.  Te Maari played one game for the Parramatta Eels in round 18 of the 2010 NRL season.

References

External links
Bulldogs profile

1985 births
New Zealand rugby league players
New Zealand Māori rugby league players
New Zealand Māori rugby league team players
St. George Illawarra Dragons players
Canterbury-Bankstown Bulldogs players
Parramatta Eels players
Wentworthville Magpies players
Rugby league second-rows
Rugby league locks
Living people
Rugby league players from Tokoroa